It's a Wonderful World may refer to:

It's a Wonderful World (1939 film), a comedy starring Claudette Colbert and James Stewart
It's a Wonderful World (1956 film), a British musical film
It's a Wonderful World (album), an album by Mr. Children
"It's a Wonderful World" (Elvis Presley song)
The World Ends with You, a 2007 action role-playing game released in Japan as It's a Wonderful World

See also
Wonderful World (disambiguation), includes uses of What a Wonderful World
It's a Wonderful Life (disambiguation)